Congo is an unincorporated community on the Ohio River in Hancock County, West Virginia, United States. It lies off West Virginia Route 2. According to the Geographic Names Information System, Congo has also been known as Hamilton and Hamilton Town throughout its history. The present name is derived from nearby Congo Run creek.

References 

Unincorporated communities in Hancock County, West Virginia
West Virginia populated places on the Ohio River
Unincorporated communities in West Virginia